Keşdiməz (also, Keshdimyaz and Keshtimez) is a village and municipality in the Agsu Rayon of Azerbaijan.  It has a population of 282.

References 

Populated places in Agsu District